House Arrest Bulgarian Домашен арест (Domashen arest) is a Bulgarian sitcom aired on bTV and produced by bTV Studios. The series marked the dawn of a new generation of Bulgarian cinema and television. Some critics have said that it is the most successful Bulgarian sitcom. The first season aired starting November 24, 2011 as part of the "Season of Bulgarian TV series". Directors of production are Peter Valchanov and Nikolay Penchev, Stanislav Todorov - Rogi, Grigor Kumitski and writer Nelly Dimitrova. Chief operator Grigor Kumitski.

House arrest is a unique product developed based on the model of American sitcoms such as Everybody Loves Raymond, Two and a Half Men, Friends among others. One of the leading British experts in this genre - director Ben Squirt - was part of the consulting team in the beginning stage of the project.

The series was filmed with HD cameras in 16:9 format, but in his first season was broadcast in 4:3, the second season changes to HD 16:9 format, along with the transition of TV to HD.

Characters 
 Mother Emi (Tatyana Lolova) - Emilia, a woman from an aristocratic family, the mother of Anastasia and Emko, mother-in-law of Kotzeto. She doesn't like her son-in-law.
 Kotzeto (Fillip Avramov) - son-in-law of Emi, father of Lucho and Zara. Freeloader of the family.
 Anastasia (Maya Bejanska) - daughter of Mother Emi, sister of Emko, mother of Lucho and Zara, wife of Kotzeto.
 Emko (Ivan Panev) - son of Mother Emi, brother of Anastasia, uncle of Lucho and Zara. He is very smart, but doesn't have many friends.
 Zara (Stefani Doycheva) - granddaughter of Mother Emi, daughter of Kotzeto and Anastasia, twin sister of Lucho
 Lucho (Velizar Velichkov) - grandson of Mother Emi, son of Kotzeto and Anastasia, twin brother of Zara
 Milko (Borislav Zahariev) - best friend of Kotzeto, a neighbor of Kotzeto
 The Blond Bisserka (Magdalena Pavlova) - a friend of Emko
 The Black Bisserka (Asya Yocheva) - a friend of Emko
 The Capitan (Veselin Kalanovski) - Mother Emi's friend
 Raicho (Nikolay Stanoev) - a friend of Kotzeto
 Bat Kolio (Kitodar Todorov) - a friend of Kotzeto
 Elenko (Valentin Goshev) - father of Kotzeto
 István Csurka Yegeresegere (Orlin Pavlov) - Hungarian, was once betrothed to Anastasia

Guest stars 
 100 Kila (Bulgarian Hip-Hop singer) - Zara's Boyfriend

Episodes

Season 1

Season 2

Season 3

Season 4

References

External links 
 Official website
 

Bulgarian television series
2010s Bulgarian television series
2011 Bulgarian television series debuts
2013 Bulgarian television series endings
BTV (Bulgaria) original programming